LATE is a term that describes a prevalent condition with impaired memory and thinking in advanced age, often culminating in the dementia clinical syndrome.  In other words, the symptoms of LATE are similar to those of Alzheimer's disease.  

The acronym LATE stands for Limbic-predominant Age-related TDP-43 Encephalopathy: “limbic” is related to the brain areas first involved, “age-related” and the name “LATE” itself refer to the onset of disease usually in persons aged 80 or older,  “TDP-43” indicates the aberrant mis-folded protein (or proteinopathy) deposits in the brain that characterize LATE, and “encephalopathy” means illness of brain.

At present LATE can only be diagnosed with certainty at autopsy. The terminology used to refer to the brain changes identified in autopsy-confirmed LATE is: LATE neuropathologic change (LATE-NC).  The diagnosis of LATE-NC at autopsy requires detection of pathologic TDP-43 protein deposits in the brain, especially in the amygdala and hippocampus.

LATE is a very common condition: autopsy studies around the world indicate that LATE is present in the brains of about one-third of people over 85.  LATE typically affects persons older than 75 years of age (with some exceptions; please see below) and becomes increasingly prevalent every year in advanced old age.  This is in contrast to Alzheimer's disease pathology, which tends to level off and perhaps decrease in prevalence among persons beyond age 85 years.   LATE is often comorbid with (i.e., occurs in the same brain as) other pathologic changes that are associated with dementia, such as Alzheimer's disease and cerebrovascular disease(s).

LATE has a large impact on public health.  Clinical-pathologic correlation studies have established that the presence of LATE-NC is associated with impairments in memory and thinking.  In older persons whose brains lack Alzheimer's disease-type amyloid plaques and neurofibrillary tangles, the presence of LATE-NC at autopsy is associated with a relatively slow cognitive decline (in comparison with Alzheimer's disease), mostly affecting the memory domain.  However, most people (~75%) beyond age 85 have some Alzheimer's disease-type pathology and in this common scenario the impact of LATE-NC is very important.  Approximately one-half of persons with Alzheimer's disease pathology also have LATE-NC. In these persons, the presence of LATE-NC is associated with a swifter disease course and with more severe clinical (memory and thinking) impairment than when only Alzheimer's disease pathology is present.   A common combination of brain pathologies—with Alzheimer's disease pathology, Lewy body pathology, and LATE-NC in the same brain—tends to affect younger individuals (often <75 yrs of age) and, on average, is associated with more aggressive (faster) cognitive deterioration.  With or without co-existing Alzheimer's disease pathology or other brain changes, persons with LATE-NC generally lack the clinical features of frontotemporal dementia (FTD).

For reasons that are presently unknown, the disease process of LATE-NC preferentially affects medial temporal lobe structures of the brain, particularly the amygdala and hippocampus.  In a significant proportion of persons with LATE-NC, there is atrophy, cell loss and astrogliosis in the hippocampus, diagnosable at autopsy (and somewhat less specifically via MRI during life) as hippocampal sclerosis.  Brains with LATE-NC and hippocampal sclerosis are relatively more affected clinically than those with LATE-NC alone.  The phenomenon of hippocampal sclerosis-linked dementia, as well as the link to TDP-43, were first described by Dr. Dennis Dickson and colleagues, and this clinical-pathologic entity was subsequently confirmed by many others.  However, brain changes diagnosable as "hippocampal sclerosis" is/are also seen in other diseases (such as epilepsy), and many LATE-NC brains lack full-blown hippocampal sclerosis, so, hippocampal sclerosis is neither a sensitive nor specific feature of LATE-NC.

The major known risk factors for LATE-NC are genetic: variations in the TMEM106B, GRN, APOE, ABCC9, KCNMB2, and WWOX genes have been linked to altered risk for LATE-NC (and/or hippocampal sclerosis dementia).

There currently is no known cure or preventative strategy for LATE-NC.

The deleterious impact(s) of TDP-43 proteinopathy may influence the brain via a number of different mechanisms. In normal brains and other tissues, the TDP-43 protein helps to ensure proper functioning of genes in the cell; the misfolded TDP-43 may thus impair normal gene expression regulation (so in LATE-NC, there is a loss-of-normal-function), and, the aberrant TDP-43 protein in LATE-NC may induce toxic gains of function also.

TDP-43 proteinopathy (a disease-associated phenomenon discovered by Dr. Manuela Neumann and colleagues at UPENN in the Drs John Trojanowski/Virginia Lee CNDR Lab) is also implicated in frontotemporal lobar degeneration (FTLD), amyotrophic lateral sclerosis (ALS), and other diseases.

References

Further reading
 

Dementia
Ailments of unknown cause